Heywood House Gardens, generally Heywood Gardens, form the grounds of a now-vanished house in County Laois, Ireland. The estate was developed in the late 18th century by Michael Frederick Trench, a politician, landowner and architect. He built a substantial house and laid out an extensive park, under the direction of James Gandon. In the early 20th century, Heywood was owned by Sir Hutcheson Poë who commissioned Edwin Lutyens to develop the gardens immediately surrounding the house. Lutyens engaged his long-time collaborator Gertrude Jekyll to undertake the planting. The house was demolished after a fire in 1950 and the gardens are now in the care of the Office of Public Works.

History and architecture
Michael Frederick Trench built Heywood House and developed the surrounding estate in conjunction with James Gandon. The resulting parkland was considered by contemporaries to be one of the finest 18th century Romantic landscapes in Ireland. The estate descended by marriage to the Poë family in the 19th century, when Colonel Hutcheson Poë married Mary Adelaide Compton Domvile in 1886. In 1906 Poë determined on the development of a new garden immediately adjacent to the house. The recommendation for Edwin Lutyens came from the colonial administrator Henry McMahon, who knew Lutyens personally. By this date Lutyens had established himself as one of England's leading architects of country houses and gardens. In his study of English domestic buildings, Das englische Haus, published in 1904, Hermann Muthesius had written of him, "He is a young man who has come increasingly to the forefront of domestic architects and who may soon become the accepted leader among English builders of houses". The site Lutyens was required to develop was unpromising; Heywood was set high on an elevated embankment with little space on the garden front between the house and an "enormous cliff-like buttress" which separated the house from the parkland. Lutyens responded with the creation of a terrace linking a series of small garden rooms and leading to a circular Italian garden at the western end. The garden contains an oval pool, surrounded by turtles and with a fountain at its centre. Gertrude Jekyll undertook the planting. Poë was reputed to have spent £250,000 on the redevelopment of the house and estate. Christopher Hussey, in his official biography The Life of Sir Edwin Lutyens, records that the Heywood scheme, ‘though architecturally superb, proved very much more costly than the client had contemplated".

Following Poë's death in 1934 the house was left empty until it was purchased in 1941 by the Salesian Brothers for the establishment of a seminary. During their tenure, the house was almost destroyed in a fire in 1951. It was subsequently demolished. The seminary moved to a new site and the gardens passed into the care of the Office of Public Works.

Gallery

Notes

References

Sources
 
 
 
 
 

Buildings and structures in County Laois
Works of Edwin Lutyens in Ireland